Emre Balak (born 11 August 1988 in Samsun, Turkey) is a Turkish footballer. He currently plays as a defender for Aliağa FK.

External links
 
 
 

1988 births
Living people
Gençlerbirliği S.K. footballers
Samsunspor footballers
TKİ Tavşanlı Linyitspor footballers
Bucaspor footballers
Nazilli Belediyespor footballers
Fethiyespor footballers
Süper Lig players
TFF First League players
TFF Second League players
Turkish footballers
Turkey under-21 international footballers
Turkey youth international footballers
People from Merzifon
Association football defenders